The Andrussow process is an industrial process for the production of hydrogen cyanide from methane and ammonia in the presence of oxygen and a platinum catalyst.

2 CH4  +  2 NH3  +  3 O2 →   2 HCN  +  6 H2O

The process is based on a reaction that was discovered by Leonid Andrussow in 1927. In the following years he developed the process that is named after him. HCN is also produced in the BMA process.

Side reactions
This reaction is very exothermic. The change of enthalpy of this reaction is equal to -481.06 kJ. The heat provided by the main reaction serves as a catalyst for other side reactions.
CH4 + H2O → CO + 3 H2
2 CH4 + 3 O2 → 2 CO + 4 H2O
4 NH3 + 3 O2 → 2 N2 + 6 H2O

These side reactions can be reduced by only short exposures to the catalyst of the order of 0.0003s.

References

Organic redox reactions
Industrial processes
Catalysis
Name reactions